David James Stuart Mitchell (born 14 July 1974) is a British comedian, actor, writer and television personality. He is part of the comedy duo Mitchell and Webb, alongside Robert Webb.

Mitchell and Webb starred in the Channel 4 sitcom Peep Show, in which Mitchell plays Mark Corrigan. Mitchell won the British Academy Television Award for Best Comedy Performance in 2009 for his performance. The duo have written and starred in several sketch shows including Bruiser, The Mitchell and Webb Situation, That Mitchell and Webb Sound and also That Mitchell and Webb Look. The pair also starred in the UK version of Apple's "Get a Mac" advertising campaign. Their first film, Magicians, was released in 2007. In 2013, the duo starred in the short-lived TV series Ambassadors. Since 2017, Mitchell has starred in the Channel 4 comedy-drama Back, alongside Webb.

Mitchell starred as Owen in Think the Unthinkable, and in the Ben Elton-penned BBC Two historical comedy Upstart Crow (2016–), playing the central character William Shakespeare.

Mitchell is a frequent participant on British panel shows, being a team captain on Would I Lie to You?, the host of The Unbelievable Truth on BBC Radio 4, and the former host of The Bubble and Was It Something I Said?, as well as guesting on other panel shows including QI, The Big Fat Quiz of the Year, Mock the Week, 8 Out of 10 Cats Does Countdown and Have I Got News for You. He was also a co-host of the comedy news programme 10 O'Clock Live. As a writer, Mitchell contributes comment articles to the British newspapers The Observer and The Guardian.

Early life
Mitchell was born in Salisbury, Wiltshire, England, to Ian Douglas Mitchell and Kathryn Grey Mitchell (née Hughes), who were, at that time, hotel managers. In 1977, when Mitchell was two years old, his parents gave up their jobs to lecture in hotel management, which gave them more time to look after him. He attended Napier House Primary School. He is the older of two boys, his brother Daniel being born when David was seven. The family moved to Oxford, where Mitchell's parents became lecturers at Oxford Polytechnic, now Oxford Brookes University. Mitchell attended New College School, which is an independent preparatory school in the city. In a 2006 interview with The Independent, Mitchell stated his childhood dreams:

From the age of thirteen, Mitchell was educated at Abingdon School, a public school in Oxfordshire. Having always been top of the class at primary school and prep school, once he moved to Abingdon, he realised that there were plenty of people more intelligent than he was, so he turned his attention to debating and drama, "where [he] had a chance of being the best". There, Mitchell often took part in plays, "largely because you got to play cards backstage." His roles mainly consisted of small minute-long parts, until he won the role of Rabbit in Winnie-the-Pooh. This was the first time that he was "consciously aware I was doing a performance" and that that "was better, even, than playing cards." Mitchell had been "obsessed" with comedy writing since his school days, as he "always felt that doing a joke was the cleverest thing", and "would intrinsically prefer a parody of something to the actual thing itself".

Education
Rejected by Merton College, Oxford, in 1993, Mitchell went to Peterhouse, Cambridge, where he studied history. There, he began performing with the Cambridge Footlights, of which he became President for the 1995–96 academic year.

Mitchell was in his first year at university when he met Robert Webb during rehearsals for a Footlights production of Cinderella, in 1993, and the two men soon established a comedy partnership. According to Mitchell, these factors had a detrimental effect on his academic performance at university and he attained a 2:2 in his final exams.

Career

Early work and Peep Show
Before his break into comedy, Mitchell worked as an usher at the Lyric Hammersmith theatre, and in the cloakroom of TFI Friday among other jobs.

Mitchell's first project with Webb was in January 1995, a show about a nuclear apocalypse entitled Innocent Millions Dead or Dying: A Wry Look at the Post-Apocalyptic Age. Webb later described it as being "fucking terrible". After leaving university he and Webb began performing a number of two-man shows at the Edinburgh Fringe.

As a result of their performances at the Edinburgh Fringe, the duo were given the chance to write for Alexander Armstrong and Ben Miller and for series two of Big Train. After minor work on The Jack Docherty Show and Comedy Nation, their first break into television acting was in 2000, on the short-lived BBC sketch show Bruiser, which they primarily wrote, and starred in. The show also featured future Academy Award and BAFTA winner Olivia Colman, who would become a regular cast member of Mitchell and Webb projects, and Martin Freeman, later of The Office fame. Other cast members included Matthew Holness and Charlotte Hudson. Additional material for the show was provided by various people, including Ricky Gervais and James Bachman.

In 2001 the two men were commissioned for a sketch show of their own, entitled The Mitchell and Webb Situation, which ran for six episodes on the now defunct channel Play UK. The show was reasonably well received. Wessex Scenes Darren Richman said "what the series lacked in budget, it made up for in magnificent material" and went on to call it "far superior to the vastly overrated Little Britain" and "perhaps the greatest forgotten sketch show of modern times." Eureka! TV, which released The Mitchell and Webb Situation on DVD in 2005, said that the show "gushes forth an hilarious stream of surreal and quirkily inventive sketches", as well as calling it a "cult success". In the interview with Wessex Scene, Mitchell stated that he was "more proud of the way it turned out than annoyed that it was only aired on a small channel."

Mitchell and Webb's next project came in 2003, with starring roles in the Channel 4 sitcom Peep Show, as flatmates Mark Corrigan and Jeremy Usbourne respectively. The show originated from writers Jesse Armstrong and Sam Bain's failed attempt to complete a team-written sitcom for the BBC; they had an old script that they wanted to revive and Mitchell and Webb helped out, with it eventually evolving into Peep Show. Despite low viewing figures (which almost got the show cancelled after series three) the show was received to wide critical acclaim. The British Sitcom Guide called it "without a doubt one of the best sitcoms of the decade." Ricky Gervais has been cited as saying "the last thing I got genuinely excited about on British TV was Peep Show, which I thought was the best sitcom since Father Ted". The BBC hailed Mitchell's performance in the series, citing that "As Mark Corrigan, David reached out to all those middle-aged men in a twentysomething's body, who believe drugs are boring and systems are necessary if society is to function at all." Mitchell has stated that he empathises with Mark and enjoys playing him and that he "agrees with many of [Mark's] opinions." Peep Show aired for nine series, which makes it the longest-running sitcom in Channel 4 history.

In 2009, Mitchell won the British Academy Television Award for Best Comedy Performance for his work on Peep Show, after having lost in the same category the year before. He was nominated again in 2010. He won the award "Best Television Comedy Actor" at the 2007 British Comedy Awards, and the pair shared the 2007 Royal Television Society Award for "Comedy Performance". They were also jointly nominated for "Best Television Comedy Actor" at the 2006 British Comedy Awards. Peep Show itself has also won the BAFTA for "Best situation comedy" in 2008, and the British Comedy Award for "Best TV comedy" in 2006, and retained it the following year. It also won "Best TV Comedy" at the South Bank Show Awards, and claimed a Golden Rose in 2004.

Other Mitchell and Webb projects

After the success of Peep Show, Mitchell and Webb returned to sketch comedy with their BBC Radio 4 sketch show That Mitchell and Webb Sound, which ran for five series. The show was adapted for television and became That Mitchell and Webb Look. Producer Gareth Edwards described it as "the shortest pitch [he had] ever written". The show ran for four series. Towards the end of 2006 the pair made their first tour, with a show called The Two Faces of Mitchell and Webb. The tour was criticised as just "a succession of largely unrelated scenes" by The Guardians Brian Logan, who gave it a rating of two stars.

That Mitchell and Webb Look won them the BAFTA for Best Comedy Programme or Series at the 2007 awards, and they earned a further nomination for it in 2009. It was nominated for two British Comedy Awards in 2006: Britain's Best New TV Comedy and the Highland Spring People's Choice. Their stage tour The Two Faces of Mitchell and Webb was nominated for the British Comedy Award for Best Stage Comedy, and That Mitchell and Webb Sound won a Sony Silver Award.

Their first film, Magicians, was released on 18 May 2007. It was directed by Andrew O'Connor and written by Jesse Armstrong and Sam Bain. Mitchell played the role of a magician named Harry. Later in 2007, the pair recorded a pilot BBC Radio 2 sitcom entitled Daydream Believers, in which Mitchell played Ray, a science-fiction writer. The show was previously a one-off television pilot from Channel 4's Comedy Lab, and also starred Mitchell and Webb.

Mitchell and Webb's first comedy book, This Mitchell and Webb Book, was published in 2009. A second book was planned for 2010. They also wrote and filmed Playing Shop, a comedy television pilot for BBC2 about two men who operate a business out of their shed. Although the BBC commissioners were happy with it, Mitchell and Webb scrapped it themselves, as they felt it was too similar to Peep Show. A new pilot had been commissioned, but the plan was later shelved. Mitchell and Webb voiced a robotic duo in the Doctor Who episode "Dinosaurs on a Spaceship" in 2012.

In 2007 the duo fronted the UK version of Apple Inc.'s "Get a Mac" adverts, with Mitchell playing PC. The adverts received much criticism. Writing in The Guardian, Charlie Brooker claimed that the use of Mitchell and Webb in the adverts was a curious choice. He compared the characters of PC and Mac in the adverts to those of Mark and Jeremy in Peep Show, stating that "when you see the ads, you think, 'PCs are a bit rubbish yet ultimately lovable, whereas Macs are just smug, preening tossers.'" The British Sitcom Guide also criticised the pair for "selling their souls". One journalist called the adverts "worse than not funny", and accused Mitchell and Webb of "an act of grave betrayal" for taking corporate work. In an interview with The Telegraph, Robert Webb responded to the duo's critics, stating that "when someone asks, 'Do you want to do some funny ads for not many days in the year and be paid more than you would be for an entire series of Peep Show?' the answer, obviously, is, 'Yeah, that's fine.'" In the same interview, Mitchell also said: "I don't see what is morally inconsistent with a comedian doing an advert. It's all right to sell computers, isn't it? Unless you think that capitalism is evil – which I don't. It's not like we're helping to flog a baby-killing machine."

In 2005, the duo were placed ninth on a list of the United Kingdom's best television talent, and were named twelfth in a Radio Times list of the most powerful people in television comedy.

Solo acting, presenting and writing
As well as his work alongside Webb, Mitchell has appeared on his own in several shows. He played technical expert Owen in the Radio 4 sitcom Think the Unthinkable in 2001. He played the surgeon Dr Toby Stephens in the BBC2 sitcom Doctors and Nurses. In 2005 he played Kate's hapless secretary Tim in the BBC's updating of The Taming of The Shrew in its ShakespeaRe-Told series. Mitchell appeared as various roles on the Channel 4 sketch programme Blunder. The show was not well received, with the British Sitcom Guide naming it as the worst thing that Mitchell did in all of 2006 in their "British Sitcom Awards" of that year. He portrayed the recurring character of Dr. James Vine in the BBC sitcom Jam and Jerusalem. Mitchell had a small part in the film I Could Never Be Your Woman, playing an English writer, also named David. While in Los Angeles to record the part he decided that he did not like the area much, and preferred filming in Britain.

He wrote series five of the BBC2 impressionist sketch show Dead Ringers, and voiced Mitch in the Disney animated series Phineas and Ferb. He also narrated the reality show Beauty and the Geek. Following the success of Channel 4's Alternative Election Night in 2010, which Mitchell hosted with Jimmy Carr, Charlie Brooker and Lauren Laverne, the four presented 10 O'Clock Live, a series of live shows looking at the week's affairs. Mitchell has a solo segment entitled Listen to Mitchell. The show ran for three series.

Mitchell has presented four series of the online video show David Mitchell's Soapbox, a series of short monologues co-written with John Finnemore for ChannelFlip. In these monologues Mitchell has criticised a variety of subjects, including the BBC show Doctor Who and 3D television. Matt Warman of The Daily Telegraph suggested that the series could be a sign that new comedy will increasingly become available online, rather than on television. The series has been released on DVD.

He provided the voiceover for a £1 million government advert for FRANK, warning of the dangers of cocaine, as "Pablo the Drug Mule Dog"; and also for the Driving Standards Agency's "The Highway Code". He writes columns for The Observer and The Guardian. He also took part in Channel 4's Comedy Gala, a benefit show held in aid of Great Ormond Street Children's Hospital at the O2 Arena. In October 2009, Mitchell signed a deal with HarperCollins and its imprint Fourth Estate to write a volume of memoirs and a novel. The memoirs, Back Story: A Memoir, was published in October 2012 with the novel scheduled for 2013.

Mitchell plays William Shakespeare in all three series of the sitcom Upstart Crow, the first series of which was broadcast in 2016 as part of the celebrations of the 400th anniversary of the playwright's death.

Stage
Mitchell made his stage debut in Ben Elton's The Upstart Crow which premiered in London in February 2020 at the Gielgud Theatre. He played the part of Shakespeare as in the television series Upstart Crow which inspired the play.

Panel shows
Mitchell has become a regular participant on many panel shows, leading The Independents James Rampton to christen him "if not king, then certainly prince regent of the panel games." Mitchell is a team captain on the BBC panel show Would I Lie To You?, opposite Lee Mack. The show has run since 2007, now airing in its fifteenth series. Since 2006, he has hosted 20 series of The Unbelievable Truth, a panel game on BBC Radio 4. The inaugural episode of Was It Something I Said?, a panel comedy show that Mitchell hosts, was broadcast on Channel 4 in October 2013.

He was a team captain on the Channel 4 comedy quiz show Best of the Worst, opposite Johnny Vaughan. Mitchell has also hosted ten episodes of Have I Got News For You. Mitchell hosted the panel show The Bubble. He hosted the second week of Channel 4's FAQ U, and appeared as himself in an episode of Rob Brydon's Annually Retentive, a panel show parody. He also appeared as one of the participants on the Channel 4 show TV Heaven, Telly Hell, and has appeared on several episodes of Question Time. Other appearances include QI, Have I Got News for You, Mock the Week, Just a Minute, Armando Iannucci's Charm Offensive and 8 Out of 10 Cats, as well as appearances on The Big Fat Quiz of the Year in 2005, 2007, 2009, 2011, 2014, 2015, 2016, 2017, 2018 and 2020.
In a 2007 interview with Digital Spy, Mitchell stated that he enjoyed panel shows, as they are "a game worth playing". He then further explained his appreciation of the panel format by challenging criticism from Fast Show co-creator Charlie Higson, who stated in September 2013 that panel comedies were overtaking television programming at the expense of sketch shows and sitcoms:

The Radio Times named him "The Best Comedy Panel Show Guest" in the world, stating that "he's incredibly, disgustingly witty" and "even starting to make Paul Merton look slow on the uptake".

Following his BAFTA win, Mitchell was ranked at No. 53 in the 2009 MediaGuardian 100, an annual ranking of media people in The Guardian. In reference to his ubiquitous presence in broadcast and print media, The Guardians writer called him "the go-to funnyman of the moment". In their entry for Peep Show on their list of "The top 50 TV shows of the Noughties", The Times labelled Mitchell "a national institution".

Influences
Mitchell's favourite actor is Sir Alec Guinness, and he lists Spike Milligan, Peter Sellers and Peter Cook as his comedy idols. Additionally, following the death of British actor Richard Briers in February 2013, Mitchell revealed that whenever he has acted he "always hoped to be something like him". Mitchell has also identified Morecambe and Wise, Monty Python and The Two Ronnies as highly influential on his career.

Personal life
Because Mitchell's Merseyside-born father's family were from Scotland and his mother is Welsh, Mitchell considers himself British rather than English. He explored his ancestry in an episode of the television programme Who Do You Think You Are?, discovering his connection to the Gaelic scholars John Forbes and Alexander Robert Forbes. On 7 August 2014, Mitchell was one of 200 public figures who were signatories to a letter to The Guardian expressing their hope that Scotland would vote to remain part of the United Kingdom in September's referendum on that issue. Mitchell's participation in the open letter follows a May 2011 column in The Observer, in which he concludes that "If Scotland ever goes it alone ... the British will have lost their country".

Mitchell has often joked about his personal life in interviews. In 2005, he stated that he had "been in so many situations when I've just said nothing to someone I've fancied". He later added that "I'm sort of all right on my own. I don't want it to be forever, but the fundamental thing is I'm all right alone." For many years he lived in Kilburn, London, as the flatmate of novelist Robert Hudson. In 2006, he was best man at Robert Webb's wedding to Abigail Burdess.

He first met broadcaster Victoria Coren at Jonathan Ross's annual Halloween party in 2007 and was "completely smitten". She decided to pursue someone else and he pined for her but in December 2010 they began dating. In March 2012, their engagement was announced in The Times, and they married on 17 November 2012 with Robert Webb as his best man. In May 2015, Coren announced the birth of their daughter.

He remains interested in history and said in an interview with The Observer that "I can see myself in a few years' time joining the National Trust and going round the odd castle. I think I might find that restful as the anger of middle age sets in". In his interview on Parkinson he said that if he could go back in time to do one thing, it would be to go to the building of Stonehenge, to ask them "why they were bothering".

He is a cricket and snooker fan, and also plays squash and tennis. He does not drive. He is an agnostic.

Mitchell walks for an hour daily to help a bad back and has lost weight as a result, but he "probably [has] quite a bad diet" and "probably drinks too much". He describes himself as a worrier.

Beyond the realm of film and television, Mitchell cites Evelyn Waugh among his favourite authors. He appeared on the radio programme Desert Island Discs. Mitchell has revealed that he once attended a Shirley Bassey concert and that he owns just two CDs: Phil Collins's ... But Seriously and Susan Boyle's I Dreamed a Dream.

Credits

Film

Television

Non-fictional appearances

As narrator
 Beauty and the Geek (2006)
 Sci-Fi Saved My Life (2007)
 TV Is Dead? (2007)
 Wonderland – The Secret Life of Norman Wisdom Aged 92¾ (2008)
 Blackadder Exclusive: The Whole Rotten Saga (2008)
 Blackadder's Most Cunning Moments (2008)
 The Real Swiss Family Robinson (2009)
 The Million Pound Bike Ride: A Sport Relief Special (2010)
 Around the World in 90 Minutes (2010)
 Horizon: Dancing in the Dark: The End of Physics? (2015)
 Marks & Spencer Channel 4 Mrs Claus endorsement (2016)

Panel games
 Fanorama – Team captain (2001–2002)
 Does Doug Know? – 2 appearances (2002)
 FAQ U – Host for 5 episodes (2005)
 Have I Got News for You – 17 appearances; 14 times as guest presenter (2005–2018)
 Mock the Week – 11 appearances (2005–2009)
 QI – 32 appearances (2005–2021)
 The Big Fat Quiz of the Year – 9 appearances (2005, 2007, 2009, 2011, 2014, 2015, 2016, 2017, 2020)
 Best of the Worst – Team captain (2006)
 Would I Lie to You? – Team captain (2007–)
 The Big Fat Anniversary Quiz – 1 appearance (2007)
 8 Out of 10 Cats – 1 appearance (2008)
 You Have Been Watching – 2 appearances (2009–2010)
 The Bubble – host (2010)
 24 Hour Panel People – 1 appearance (2011)
 The Big Fat Quiz of the '00s – 1 appearance (2012)
 The Big Fat Quiz of the '80s – 1 appearance (2013)
 Only Connect – 1 appearance (2013)
 Was it Something I Said? – host (2013)
 8 Out of 10 Cats Does Countdown – 8 appearances (2014–2019)
 Outsiders - host (2021)

Other programmes
 The 100 Greatest Cartoons (2005)
 Britain's 50 Greatest Comedy Sketches (2005)
 Imagine – 1 appearance (2006)
 TV Heaven, Telly Hell – 1 appearance (2006)
 The Law of the Playground – 7 appearances (2006)
 Friday Night with Jonathan Ross – 2 appearances (2007, 2009)
 The World's Greatest Comedy Characters (2007)
 Dawn French's Boys Who Do Comedy (2007)
 Parkinson – 1 appearance (2007)
 Time Shift – 1 appearance (2007)
 Lily Allen and Friends – 1 appearance (2008)
 The Graham Norton Show – 4 appearances (2008, 2009, 2011, 2013)
 Question Time – 3 appearances (2008, 2009, 2011)
 Who Do You Think You Are? – 1 appearance (2009)
 This Morning – 3 appearances (2009, 2012, 2013)
 The One Show – 2 appearances (2009, 2011)
 Alan Carr: Chatty Man – 2 appearances (2009, 2013)
 Channel 4's Comedy Gala (2010)
 Channel 4's Alternative Election Night – host (2010)
 BBC Breakfast – 5 appearances (2010, 2011, 2012)
 10 O'Clock Live – Co-host (2011– )
 Mark Lawson Talks to... – 1 appearance (2011)
 Ronnie Corbett's Comedy Britain – 1 appearance (2011)
 QI – Genesis (2011)
 Michael McIntyre's Christmas Comedy Roadshow (2011)
 Channel 4's 30 Greatest Comedy Shows (2012)
 The Jonathan Ross Show (2012)
 Goodbye Television Centre (2013)
 The Comedy Vaults: BBC2's Hidden Treasure (2014)
 50 Years of BBC2 Comedy 
 The Last Leg – 2 appearances (2015, 2019)
 Celebrity Gogglebox for su2c  – 1 appearance (2020) alongside Victoria Coren Mitchell

Radio

Non-fictional appearances

Publications
 This Mitchell and Webb Book (2009), with Robert Webb
 Back Story: A Memoir (2012)
 Thinking About It Only Makes It Worse (2014)
 Dishonesty is the Second-Best Policy: And Other Rules to Live By (2019)

See also
 List of Old Abingdonians

References

Bibliography

External links

 
 
 
 
 Upstart Crow clips at BBC

Living people
1974 births
20th-century English male writers
21st-century British male actors
20th-century British male actors
21st-century English male writers
Alumni of Peterhouse, Cambridge
Apple Inc. advertising
Best Comedy Performance BAFTA Award (television) winners
British agnostics
British autobiographers
British columnists
British comedy writers
British male comedians
British male comedy actors
British male film actors
British people of Scottish descent
British people of Welsh descent
British male television actors
British surrealist artists
British television writers
Comedians from Wiltshire
Male actors from Oxfordshire
Male actors from Wiltshire
British male television writers
People educated at Abingdon School
People educated at New College School
Actors from Oxford
People from Salisbury
Surreal comedy
Television personalities from Wiltshire
The Observer people
Writers from Wiltshire
Coren family